Sir Robert Andrew Allison (3 March 1838 – 15 January 1926) was an English Liberal politician  who sat in the House of Commons from 1885 to 1900.

Allison was the son of Joseph Allison of Eden Morent Carlisle and his wife Jane Andrew. He was  educated at Rugby School and at Trinity College, Cambridge. He was a director of the Midland Railway. In 1885, he was elected as MP for Eskdale and held the seat until 1900. He was J.P. and Deputy Lieutenant for Cumberland and was High Sheriff of Cumberland in 1908. He was knighted in 1910.

Allison was the author of several works including 
Essays and Addresses 1913
Belgium in History 1914
Cicero in Old Age 1916
Translations into English Verse ..Greek Anthology 1922

Allison lived at Scaleby Hall, Carlisle, where he died at the age of 87.

Allison married Laura Alicia Milner Atkinson in 1867 as his first wife.

Election contests

References

1838 births
1926 deaths
People educated at Rugby School
Alumni of Trinity College, Cambridge
Liberal Party (UK) MPs for English constituencies
UK MPs 1885–1886
UK MPs 1886–1892
UK MPs 1892–1895
UK MPs 1895–1900
Deputy Lieutenants of Cumberland
High Sheriffs of Cumberland